Alexandru Nicolae Mustățea (30 August 1946 - 12 October 2001) was a Romanian football midfielder and referee. As a referee he arbitrated matches in Romania's top-league Divizia A.

Honours
Dinamo București
Divizia A: 1970–71

References

External links

Alexandru Mustățea at Labtof.ro

1946 births
2001 deaths
Romanian footballers
Association football midfielders
Liga I players
FC Argeș Pitești players
FC Dinamo București players
FC Universitatea Cluj players
Romanian football referees
Footballers from Bucharest